Thalassomonas actiniarum  is a heterotrophic  bacterium from the genus of Thalassomonas which has been isolated from marine animals.

References

External links
Type strain of Thalassomonas actiniarum at BacDive -  the Bacterial Diversity Metadatabase

 

Alteromonadales
Bacteria described in 2009